El derecho de los hijos is a Mexican telenovela produced by Ernesto Alonso for Televisión Independiente de México in 1971.

Cast 
Guillermo Murray
Silvia Derbez
Nadia Milton
Xavier Marc
María Eugenia San Martín 
Alejandro Ciangherotti
Martha Patricia
J.A. Monsel

References

External links 

Mexican telenovelas
1971 telenovelas
Televisa telenovelas
Spanish-language telenovelas
1971 Mexican television series debuts
1971 Mexican television series endings